The Star of Christmas is a 2002 American computer-animated film and is the fourteenth episode of the VeggieTales animated series and the second holiday special in that series. It was released on October 26, 2002 and re-released on September 5, 2006, in Holiday Double Feature with its earlier episode The Toy that Saved Christmas. Like the other holiday episodes, it has no usual ”A Lesson in...” subtitle and the countertops. The film's message is that the true Star of Christmas is not so much something as it is someone: Jesus Christ, the Son of God. The film teaches that the story of His birth is the ultimate reflection of true love, and likewise should be the inspiration for how we love others.

The Star of Christmas centers on two would-be operatic composers who are based on W. S. Gilbert and Arthur Sullivan. VeggieTales has spoofed Gilbert and Sullivan's work in Lyle the Kindly Viking and (specifically The Mikado) in Sumo of the Opera. In this episode however they spoof the people, Gilbert and Sullivan, themselves.

The film was nominated for an Annie Award in 2002 in the category of Outstanding Achievement in an Animated Home Video Production, but lost to Rolie Polie Olie: The Great Defender of Fun.

Plot 

Cavis Appythart (Bob the Tomato) and Millward Phelps (Larry the Cucumber) are jingle writers who want to make their big break in musical theatre. Millward is content with small time fame, however Cavis wishes to use their fame to create a difference in London through a grand musical. The opportunity arises when Millward's Uncle Nezzer allows them to use his theatre. They plan a production entitled "The Princess and the Plumber."

Seymour Schwenk, their friend and inventor, delivers a box of light bulbs. Cavis believes that if their production is glitzy and bright, then it will be a bigger hit and reach more people. He plans to integrate the lights into the scenery and costumes

Cavis and Millward must convince Constance Effie, a famous actor, to star within their show. They must also convince Prince Calvin Fredrick to attend the premier. Whilst Calvin and his assistant work on another show, Millward struggles to complete the script. Everything begins to come together for Cavis, who now feels confident in their production.

After noticing a flyer for a Christmas pageant planned to debut on the same night at a local church, Cavis goes to investigate. He observes Edmund Gilbert preparing a children's play featuring an object called the "Star of Christmas". Wondering aloud about this as he leaves the church, Cavis is overheard by Arthur Hollingshead. Arthur, a historian, reveals that the Star of Christmas is an ancient relic not been seen by the public in 79 years. He rushes off with great excitement to report the news, which promptly makes the front-page headline the following morning.

Faced with the prospect of losing their audience to the pageant, Cavis vows to make their own production greater and flashier. But they cannot compete with the Star of Christmas, and in desperation Cavis and Millward go to the church to steal the Star. They narrowly escape the aged "Moyer the Destroyer" who guards the relic. With the Star and flashy lights, Cavis is certain "The Princess and the Plumber" is now a guaranteed success, but during dress rehearsal, the excessive amount of lights ignite the curtains. In minutes the theater goes up in flames and with it the Star of Christmas. An officer named Dwiglight Howarde arrives with Moyer McGonnigal, and arrests Cavis and Millward.

In the jail, they meet a scallion prisoner, Charles Pincher, who laughs at their efforts to spread love by means of an elaborate stage production. He claims real love does not expect fame or wealth in return— real love makes sacrifices to help others without expectation of personal gain. That kind of love, he says, is extremely rare.

Edmund and his father, Reverend, arrive at the jail to release Cavis and Millward. They have chosen not to press charges for the theft of the Star. Cavis is moved, and he expresses his desire to attend the pageant, but the pageant starts in ten minutes and there is not enough time to get there. Just then, Seymour shows up in the rocket car, trusting Millward to drive the vehicle and get them all to the church on time. It is a harrowing ride fraught with collisions and near-misses, but they do arrive just as the pageant is about to start.

The pageant goes on with the Prince and Miss Pickering in attendance. Cavis finally learns Christmas is not about glitz and grand productions; he understands it is about Jesus. After the play, Millward's Uncle Nezzer arrives revealing he heard about what happened to the theater, and hires the two to work at his factory to pay it off. Then Moyer shows up and says the real Star of Christmas is actually safe, and they had taken the Turtle of Damascus, which most people consider a hoax. The episode ends with Cavis and Millward taking cookies and a gift to Charles Pincher in jail.

Production 

The studio was on a tight schedule in early Christmas 2001 to get the film done. Then, the air condition was left on, and a heat wave never hit Big Idea. Most people slept in their offices trying to get The Star of Christmas finished. Towards the end/before it wrapped, Mike Nawrocki was said he would be on his Sunday drive around the time of New Year's Eve. They were at a cafe, the same cafe they used for the premiere of "Larryboy and the Rumor Weed". There was Lisa Vischer singing "O Come, O Come Emmanuel" during the "Star of Christmas" premier.

Cast of characters 

 Phil Vischer as Cavis Appythart (Bob the Tomato), Seymour Schwenk (Pa Grape), Jeffrey (Jimmy Gourd), Prince Fredrick (Mr. Lunt), Ebenezer Nezzer, Arthur Hollingshead (Archibald Asparagus), Benny (Percy Pea), Phillipe Pea, Frairie Peas and Cast Members
 Mike Nawrocki as Millward Phelps (Larry the Cucumber), Winston (Jean-Claude Pea), Dwiglight Howarde (Jerry Gourd), Frairie Peas, Stranger Pea and Cast Members
 Jacquelyn Ritz as Effie Pickering (Madame Blueberry) and Mary (Laura Carrot)
 Lisa Vischer as Edmund Gilbert (Junior Asparagus)
 Dan Anderson as Reverend Gilbert (Dad Asparagus)
 Jim Poole as Moyer McGonnigal (Scooter Carrot)
 Tim Hodge as Charlie Pincher
 Shelby Vischer as Abigail (Annie)
 Matthew Hodge as Wiseman Pea
 Josh Vulcano as Angel Pea
 Mike Sage as Tradesman (Scallion #3)

Walla Group: Ian Anderson, Adam Frick, Tim Hodge, Laura Richy, Aimee Dupriest, Peggy Heinrichsen, Julea Love and Jesse Tewson

Songs 
Due to the format of the show, this episode does not contain the usual "What We Have Learned" or "VeggieTales Theme". It does contain five original (short) compositions and one Christmas traditional:

 "First Big Break", sung by Cavis Appythart
 "We Are the Frarie Peas", sung by the Frarie Peas
 "Plumber, You Dropped Your Possum", sung by Millward Phelps
 "Flushing in Vain", sung by Miss Constance Effie Pickering and the Plumber
 "Plugged Up Love", sung by Miss Constance Effie Pickering, the Plumber, and the Frarie Peas
 "O Come, O Come, Emmanuel", sung by Lisa Vischer over the closing credits

See also
 List of Christmas films

References

 http://christiananswers.net/spotlight/movies/2002/thestarofchristmas.html

External links
Official Website

Airtime Listing on TBN

VeggieTales episodes
Christian animation
Films set in the 1880s
2000s Christmas films
Films set in London
2002 films
2002 computer-animated films
2000s English-language films